Kudin (also Romanized as Kūdīn; also known as Kūdīān and Kū’īn) is a village in Khorram Makan Rural District, Kamfiruz District, Marvdasht County, Fars Province, Iran. At the 2006 census, its population was 419, in 90 families.

References 

Populated places in Marvdasht County